Anna Maria Jopek (born 14 December 1970) is a Polish vocalist, songwriter, and improviser. She represented Poland in the 1997 Eurovision Song Contest, with the song "Ale jestem" and finished 11th out of 25 participating acts; and in 2002, she collaborated on an album with jazz guitarist Pat Metheny. She has received numerous awards for her music, including Michel Legrand's Personal Award in Vitebsk in 1994, as well as all of the awards for music in Poland, together with gold and platinum records.

Biography
She is the daughter of Mazowsze singer Stanisław Jopek (1935–2006), known as the "First Coachman of Poland" for his signature song "Furman" (The Coachman), and former Mazowsze dancer Maria Stankiewicz. Her 1999 Christmas album, Dzisiaj z Betleyem, features two duets with her father. Anna Maria's sister, Patrycja is a violinist.

In Poland she has sung with Marek Grechuta, Jeremi Przybora and Wojciech Młynarski. Abroad she has performed with Pat Metheny, Youssu'n Dour, Bobby McFerrin, Ivan Linz, Branford Marsalis, Nigel Kennedy, Richard Bona, Oscar Castro-Neves, Makoto Ozone and Gonzalo Rubalcaba among others. In 2017 Jopek also sung a duet with Sting on a New Year's TV program.

Jopek has performed at the world's leading concert venues such as Carnegie Hall, Hollywood Bowl, Royal Festival Hall, Tokyo Opera City Concert Hall, Blue Note Tokyo, The Israeli Opera in Tel Aviv or Hamer Hall in Melbourne. She has recorded at Peter Gabriel's Real World studio, Abbey Road in London and Power Station in New York.

In 2015 she received the Knight's Cross Order of Polonia Restituta conferred by President Bronisław Komorowski for promoting Polish art worldwide.   

In 2019 Jopek released a new album "Ulotne" (Elusive) with Branford Marsalis.

Currently, she is working on a new concert project titled "Przestworza" (The Expanses). In August 2021, she will continue this tour at Poland's most popular concert venues.

Over the past few years, Jopek has been experimenting with various stage forms. She has performed in "Czas Kobiety" (A Woman's Time), a play staged at Teatr Stary in Lublin, directed by the legend of Polish theatre – professor Leszek Mądzik. The music was written by Jopek and Robert Kubiszyn. In 2014, she accepted Song of the Goat Theatre's invitation to perform in an oratory "Return to the Voice". They held a series of performances over a month as part of the Edinburgh Fringe Festival, where she was noticed by Michael Hirst, creator of HISTORY's flagship series Vikings. The producers offered her to record a song to be featured in the show.

Discography

Solo albums

Collaborative albums

Live albums

Compilation albums

Video albums

Music videos

References

External links

 
 Profile of Anna Maria Jopek at Culture.pl

Eurovision Song Contest entrants of 1997
Eurovision Song Contest entrants for Poland
Polish jazz pianists
Polish women pianists
Polish jazz singers
Polish pop singers
Polish singer-songwriters
Polish record producers
Musicians from Warsaw
1970 births
Living people
Polish lyricists
Knights of the Order of Polonia Restituta
21st-century Polish singers
21st-century Polish women singers
21st-century pianists
Polish women record producers
21st-century women pianists